Salt Fork is a stream in Howard and Randolph Counties in the U.S. state of Missouri. It is a tributary of Bonne Femme Creek.

Salt Fork was so named on account of brine springs in the area.

See also
List of rivers of Missouri

References

Rivers of Howard County, Missouri
Rivers of Randolph County, Missouri
Rivers of Missouri